Wheel-Trans is a paratransit system in Toronto, Ontario, Canada, provided by the Toronto Transit Commission (TTC). It provides specialized door-to-door accessible transit services for persons with physical disabilities using its fleet of accessible minibuses or contracted accessible taxis. Users must register with the TTC who will typically grant access to those with permanent disabilities or show difficulty in traveling short distances. Wheel-Trans only provides service within the city of Toronto and accepts regular TTC fare.

History

Wheel-Trans was born out of an initiative by the Trans-Action Coalition, a group led by Beryl Potter lobbying for transit accessibility in Toronto. The paratransit system was officially created in 1975 as a two-year pilot project contracted to Wheelchair Mobile and operated on behalf of Metropolitan Toronto and the province of Ontario until 1976. Only individuals using wheelchairs were accepted as the original 46 users of the pilot project, and rode at no cost. In 1977 the service was contracted to All-Way Transportation Corporation of Toronto before being taken over by the TTC in 1985.

Operations

Service provision
Service is provided by accessible buses and contracted accessible taxi mini-vans. Wheel-Trans is a door-to-door service. Rides can be reserved up to one week in advance by calling the reservation line, by using the automated Ride-Line touch-tone phone service or by using the recently launched Wheel-Trans Online Trip Booking website.

Fleet

Wheel-Trans buses operates as part of the main TTC fleet but do not include wheelchair assessable buses from the regular fleet.

Contracts

Most of Wheel-Trans operations are provided by the TTC, but some of the services are contracted out to private operators.

Able Atlantic Taxi

Bee Line Taxi

Beck Taxi

Royal Taxi

Scarboro City Cab

Toronto Para Transit

Wheelchair Taxi

Assessibility outside of Wheel-Trans

As for 2017, all 1,869 buses are low floor to allow for easy accessible by mobility devices. While all subway trains are accessible, only 35 of the 69 stations have elevators. The SRT cars are not accessible. On the Toronto streetcar network, the Flexity Outlook streetcars are fully accessible. However, not all stops are easily accessible for customers in wheelchairs, particularly in winter.

See also
 Mississauga Transit Accessible Services - regular routes with accessible buses
 Transhelp - Peel Region from a variety of providers including Caledon Community Services Transportation
 York Region Transit Mobility Plus

References

External links

 TTC Wheel-Trans

Toronto Transit Commission
Paratransit services in Canada